Janez Janša (born 1958) is a Slovene politician.

Janez Janša may also refer to:

 Janez Janša (director) (born 1964), Slovene author, director and performer
 Janez Janša (performance artist) (born 1970), Slovene conceptual artist, performer and producer
 Janez Janša (visual artist) (born 1973), Slovenian visual artist